
Year 752 (DCCLII) was a leap year starting on Saturday (link will display the full calendar) of the Julian calendar. The denomination 752 for this year has been used since the early medieval period, when the Anno Domini calendar era became the prevalent method in Europe for naming years.

Events 
 By place 

 Europe 
 King Pepin III ("the Short") begins a Frankish military expedition down the Rhône Valley, and receives the submission of eastern Septimania (i.e. Nîmes, Melguelh, Agde and Béziers), after securing Count Ansemund's allegiance. 
 Siege of Narbonne: Pepin III lays siege to the fortress city of Narbonne, occupied by Gothic-Muslim forces. The garrison and residents are able to withstand the attacks, thanks to the supplies provided by sea by the Arab fleet.

 Britain 
 Battle of Burford: King Cuthred of Wessex clashes with King Æthelbald of Mercia, and takes the standard (a golden dragon). He manages to throw off his claim to Mercian overlordship.
 King Teudebur of Alt Clut dies. His son, Dumnagual III, succeeds to the throne and loses Kyle to a joint invasion, by kings Óengus I of the Picts and Eadberht of Northumbria.

 Africa 
 Abd al-Rahman ibn Habib al-Fihri, ruler of Ifriqiya (North Africa), dispatches a Muslim army and reconquers Tripolitania from the Ibadites (a puritanical Khaijite sect), driving their remnants south into the Nafusa Mountains (northwestern Libya).
 Abd al-Rahman ibn Habib al-Fihri launches an assault on the island of Sardinia, perhaps the beginning of the occupation of the island by the Muslim Arabs that lasts until 1005. He also attempts to invade Sicily, but finds the defenses too strong.

 Mesoamerica 
  Yaxun B'alam IV becomes king (ajaw) of the Maya city of Yaxchilan (modern Mexico), after a 10-year struggle for the throne.

 By topic 

 Religion 
 March 22 – Pope Zachary dies at Rome after an 11-year reign. He is succeeded by Stephen, but he dies four days after, and is not considered legitimate because he is not consecrated.
 March 26 – Pope Stephen II (sometimes referred to as Stephen III) succeeds Zachary as the 92nd pope of the Catholic Church. He marks the end of the Byzantine Papacy. 
 June – Stephen II recognizes the Carolingian Dynasty as legitimate rulers of the Frankish Kingdom. He travels to Paris and appeals for Frankish support against the Lombards.  
 Emperor Shōmu (retired since 749) takes part in the dedication ceremony of the Great Buddha, (15 metres) at Tōdai-ji in Nara (Japan), and declares himself a Buddhist.

Births 
 Al-Mada'ini, Muslim scholar and historian (d. 843)
 Irene of Athens, Byzantine empress (approximate date)
 Joannicius the Great, Byzantine theologian (d. 846)
 Zheng Yin, chancellor of the Tang Dynasty (d. 829)

Deaths 
 March 15 – Zachary, pope of the Catholic Church 
 March 26 – Stephen, pope of the Catholic Church
 Lupus, duke of Spoleto (Italy)
 Teudebur, king of Alt Clut (Scotland)

References